Asthenargus is a genus of  dwarf spiders that was first described by Eugène Louis Simon & L. Fage in 1922.

Species
 it contains twenty-one species:
Asthenargus adygeicus Tanasevitch, Ponomarev & Chumachenko, 2016 – Russia (Caucasus)
Asthenargus bracianus Miller, 1938 – Central, Eastern Europe
Asthenargus brevisetosus Miller, 1970 – Angola
Asthenargus carpaticus Weiss, 1998 – Romania
Asthenargus caucasicus Tanasevitch, 1987 – Caucasus (Russia, Georgia, Azerbaijan)
Asthenargus conicus Tanasevitch, 2006 – China
Asthenargus edentulus Tanasevitch, 1989 – Kazakhstan to China
Asthenargus expallidus Holm, 1962 – Cameroon, Congo, Kenya, Tanzania
Asthenargus helveticus Schenkel, 1936 – Germany, Switzerland, Italy to Poland
Asthenargus inermis Simon & Fage, 1922 – East Africa
Asthenargus linguatulus Miller, 1970 – Angola
Asthenargus longispina (Simon, 1915) – Spain, France
Asthenargus major Holm, 1962 – Kenya
Asthenargus marginatus Holm, 1962 – Uganda
Asthenargus matsudae Saito & Ono, 2001 – Japan
Asthenargus myrmecophilus Miller, 1970 – Angola, Nigeria
Asthenargus niphonius Saito & Ono, 2001 – Japan
Asthenargus paganus (Simon, 1884) (type) – Europe, Russia (Europe to West Siberia)
Asthenargus perforatus Schenkel, 1929 – Europe
Asthenargus placidus (Simon, 1884) – France, Switzerland
Asthenargus thaleri Wunderlich, 1983 – Nepal

See also
 List of Linyphiidae species

References

Araneomorphae genera
Linyphiidae
Spiders of Africa
Spiders of Asia